A self-administered zone is an administrative subdivision in Myanmar (Burma). There are five self-administered zones and one self-administered division.

Self-administered zones and self-administered division

See also
 Administrative divisions of Myanmar
 Autonomous administrative division

References

Types of administrative division
Subdivisions of Myanmar